Henry Warren Beatty (né Beaty; born March 30, 1937) is an American actor and filmmaker. His career spans over six decades and he has been nominated for 15 Academy Awards, including four for Best Actor, four for Best Picture, two for Best Director, three for Original Screenplay, and one for Adapted Screenplay – winning Best Director for Reds (1981). Beatty is the only person to have been nominated for acting in, directing, writing, and producing the same film, and he did so twice: first for Heaven Can Wait (with Buck Henry as co-director), and again for Reds.

Eight of the films he produced earned 53 Academy nominations. In 1999, he was awarded the Academy's highest honor, the Irving G. Thalberg Award. Beatty was nominated for 18 Golden Globe Awards, winning six, including the Golden Globe Cecil B. DeMille Award  in 2007. Among his Golden Globe nominated films are, his screen debut, Splendor in the Grass (1961), Bonnie and Clyde (1967), Shampoo (1975), Heaven Can Wait (1978), Reds (1981), Dick Tracy (1990), Bugsy (1991), Bulworth (1998), and Rules Don't Apply (2016), all of which he also produced. Director and collaborator Arthur Penn described Beatty as "the perfect producer", adding, "He makes everyone demand the best of themselves. Warren stays with a picture through editing, mixing, and scoring. He plain works harder than anyone else I have ever seen."

Early life
Henry Warren Beaty was born March 30, 1937, in Richmond, Virginia. His mother, Kathlyn Corinne (née MacLean), was a teacher from Nova Scotia. His father, Ira Owens Beaty, studied for a PhD in educational psychology and was a teacher and school administrator, in addition to working in real estate. His grandparents were also teachers. The family was Baptist. During Warren's childhood, Ira Beaty moved his family from Richmond to Norfolk and then to Arlington and Waverly, then back to Arlington, eventually taking a position at Arlington's Thomas Jefferson Junior High School in 1945. During the 1950s, the family resided in the Dominion Hills section of Arlington. Beatty's older sister is the actress, dancer and writer Shirley MacLaine. His uncle by marriage was Canadian politician A. A. MacLeod.

Beatty became interested in movies as a child, often accompanying his sister to theaters. One film that had an important early influence on him was The Philadelphia Story (1940), which he saw when it was re-released in the 1950s. He noticed a strong resemblance between its star, Katharine Hepburn, and his mother, in both appearance and personality, saying that they symbolized "perpetual integrity". Another film that influenced him was Love Affair (1939), starring one of his favorite actors, Charles Boyer. He found it "deeply moving," and recalled that "[t]his is a movie I always wanted to make." He remade Love Affair in 1994, starring alongside Annette Bening and Katharine Hepburn.

Among his favorite TV shows in the 1950s was the Texaco Star Theatre, and he began to mimic one of its regular host comedians, Milton Berle. Beatty learned to do a "superb imitation of Berle and his routine", said a friend, and often used Berle-type humor at home. His sister's memories of her brother include seeing him reading books by Eugene O'Neill or singing along to Al Jolson records. In Rules Don't Apply (2016), Beatty plays Howard Hughes, who is shown talking about and singing Jolson songs while flying his plane.

MacLaine noted — on what made her brother want to become a filmmaker, sometimes writing, producing, directing and starring in his films: "That's why he's more comfortable behind the camera ... He's in the total-control aspect. He has to have control over everything." Beatty doesn't deny that need; in speaking about his earliest parts, he said "When I acted in films I used to come with suggestions about the script, the lighting, the wardrobe, and people used to say 'Waddya want, to produce the picture as well?' And I used to say that I supposed I did."

Education
Beatty was a star football player at Washington-Lee High School in Arlington. Encouraged to act by the success of his sister, who established herself as a Hollywood star, he decided to work as a stagehand at the National Theatre in Washington, D.C. during the summer before his senior year. After graduation, he was reportedly offered ten college football scholarships, but turned them down to study liberal arts at Northwestern University (1954–55), where he joined the Sigma Chi fraternity. Beatty left college after his first year and moved  to New York City to study acting under Stella Adler at the Stella Adler Studio of Acting. He often subsisted on peanut butter and jelly sandwiches, and worked odd jobs, including dishwasher, piano player, bricklayer's assistant, construction worker, and, relatively briefly, a sandhog.

Career

1950s and 1960s
Beatty started his career making appearances on television shows such as Studio One (1957), Kraft Television Theatre (1957), and Playhouse 90 (1959). He was a semi-regular on The Many Loves of Dobie Gillis during its first season (1959–60). His performance in William Inge's A Loss of Roses on Broadway garnered him a 1960 Tony Award nomination for Best Featured Actor in a Play and a 1960 Theatre World Award. It was his sole appearance on Broadway.

Beatty made his film debut in Elia Kazan's Splendor in the Grass (1961), opposite Natalie Wood. The film was a critical and box office success and Beatty was nominated for a Golden Globe Award for Best Actor, and received the award for New Star of the Year – Actor. The film was also nominated for two Oscars, winning one.

Author Peter Biskind points out that Kazan "was the first in a string of major directors Beatty sought out, mentors or father figures from whom he wanted to learn." Beatty, years later during a Kennedy Center tribute to Kazan, told the audience that Kazan "had given him the most important break in his career." Biskind adds that they "were wildly dissimilar—mentor vs. protegé, director vs. actor, immigrant outsider vs. native son. Kazan was armed with the confidence born of age and success, while Beatty was virtually aflame with the arrogance of youth." Kazan recalls his impressions of Beatty:

Beatty followed his initial film with Tennessee Williams' The Roman Spring of Mrs. Stone (1961), with Vivien Leigh and Lotte Lenya, directed by Jose Quintero; All Fall Down (1962), with Angela Lansbury, Karl Malden and Eva Marie Saint, directed by John Frankenheimer; Lilith (1963), with Jean Seberg and Peter Fonda, directed by Robert Rossen; Promise Her Anything (1964), with Leslie Caron, Bob Cummings and Keenan Wynn, directed by Arthur Hiller; Mickey One (1965), with Alexandra Stewart and Hurd Hatfield, directed by Arthur Penn; and Kaleidoscope (1966), with Susannah York and Clive Revill, directed by Jack Smight. In 1965, he formed a production company, Tatira, which he named for Kathlyn (whose nickname was "Tat") and Ira.

At age 29, Beatty produced and acted in Bonnie and Clyde,  released in 1967. He assembled a team that included the writers Robert Benton and David Newman, and the director, Arthur Penn. Beatty selected most of the cast, including Faye Dunaway, Gene Hackman, Estelle Parsons, Gene Wilder and Michael J. Pollard. Beatty also oversaw the script and spearheaded the delivery of the film.

Beatty chose Gene Hackman because he had acted with him in Lilith in 1964 and felt he was a "great" actor. Upon completion of the film, he credited Hackman with giving the "most authentic performance in the movie, so textured and so moving", recalls Dunaway. Beatty was so impressed with Gene Wilder after seeing him in a play and did not ask him to audition for what became Wilder's screen debut. And Beatty had already known Pollard: "Michael J. Pollard was one of my oldest friends", Beatty said. "I'd known him forever; I met him the day I got my first television show. We did a play together on Broadway."

Bonnie and Clyde became a critical and commercial success, despite the early misgivings by studio head Jack Warner, who put up the production money. Before filming began, Warner said, "What does Warren Beatty think he's doing? How did he ever get us into this thing? This gangster stuff went out with Cagney." The film was nominated for ten Academy Awards, including Best Picture and Best Actor, and seven Golden Globe Awards, including Best Picture and Best Actor. Beatty was  originally entitled to 40% of the film's profits but gave 10% to Penn and  his 30% share earned him more than US$6 million.

1970s and 1980s
After Bonnie and Clyde, Beatty acted with Elizabeth Taylor in The Only Game in Town (1970), directed by George Stevens; McCabe & Mrs. Miller (1971), directed by Robert Altman; and Dollars (1971), directed by Richard Brooks.

In 1972, Beatty produced a series of benefit concerts to help with publicity and fundraising in the George McGovern 1972 presidential campaign. Beatty first put together Four for McGovern at The Forum in the Los Angeles area, convincing Barbra Streisand, Carole King and James Taylor to perform. Streisand brought Quincy Jones and his Orchestra, and recorded the album Live Concert at the Forum. Two weeks later, Beatty mounted another concert at the Cleveland Arena, in which Joni Mitchell and Paul Simon joined James Taylor.

In June 1972, Beatty produced Together for McGovern at Madison Square Garden, reuniting Simon and Garfunkel, Nichols and May, and Peter, Paul and Mary, and featuring Dionne Warwick. With these productions, campaign manager Gary Hart said that Beatty had "invented the political concert". He had mobilized Hollywood celebrities for a political cause on a scale previously unseen, creating a new power dynamic.

Beatty appeared in the films The Parallax View (1974), directed by Alan Pakula; and The Fortune (1975), directed by Mike Nichols. Taking greater control, Beatty produced, co-wrote and acted in Shampoo (1975), directed by Hal Ashby, which was nominated for four Academy Awards, including Best Original Screenplay, as well as five Golden Globe Awards, including Best Motion Picture and Best Actor. In 1978, Beatty directed, produced, wrote and acted in Heaven Can Wait (1978) (sharing co-directing credit with Buck Henry). The film was nominated for nine Academy Awards, including Best Picture, Director, Actor, and Adapted Screenplay. It also won three Golden Globe Awards, including Best Motion Picture and Best Actor.

Beatty's next film was Reds (1981), a historical epic about American Communist journalist John Reed who observed the Russian October Revolution – a project Beatty had begun researching and filming for as far back as 1970. It was a critical and commercial success, despite being an American film about an American Communist, made and released at the height of the Cold War. It received 12 Academy Award nominations – including four for Beatty (for Best Picture, Director, Actor, and Original Screenplay), winning three. Beatty won for Best Director, Maureen Stapleton won for Best Supporting Actress (playing anarchist Emma Goldman), and Vittorio Storaro won for Best Cinematography. The film received seven Golden Globe nominations, including Best Motion Picture, Director, Actor and Screenplay. Beatty won the Golden Globe Award for Best Director.

Following Reds, Beatty did not appear in a film for five years until 1987's Ishtar, written and directed by Elaine May. Following severe criticism in press reviews by the new British studio chief David Puttnam just prior to its release, the film received mixed reviews and was unimpressive commercially. Puttnam attacked several other over-budget U.S. films greenlighted by his predecessor and was fired shortly thereafter.

1990s and 2000s

Under his second production company, Mulholland Productions, Beatty produced, directed and played the title role of comic strip-based detective Dick Tracy in the 1990 film of the same name. The film received positive reviews and was one of the highest-grossing films of the year. It received seven Academy Award nominations, winning three for Best Art Direction, Best Makeup, and Best Original Song. It also received four Golden Globe Award nominations, including Best Motion Picture.

In 1991, he produced and starred as the real-life gangster Bugsy Siegel in the critically acclaimed and commercially successful film Bugsy, directed by Barry Levinson, which was nominated for ten Academy Awards, including Best Picture and Best Actor; it later won two of the awards for Best Art Direction and Best Costume Design. The film also received eight Golden Globe Award nominations, including Best Motion Picture and Best Actor, winning for Best Motion Picture. Beatty's next film, Love Affair (1994), directed by Glenn Gordon Caron, received mixed reviews and was a commercial failure.

In 1998, he wrote, produced, directed and starred in the political satire Bulworth, which was critically acclaimed and nominated for the Academy Award for Best Original Screenplay. The film also received three Golden Globe Award nominations, for Best Motion Picture, Best Actor, and Best Screenplay. Beatty has appeared briefly in numerous documentaries, including Madonna: Truth or Dare (1991) and One Bright Shining Moment: The Forgotten Summer of George McGovern (2005).

Following the poor box office performance of Town & Country (2001), in which Beatty starred, he did not appear in or direct another film for 15 years.

In May 2005, Beatty sued Tribune Media, claiming he still maintained the rights to Dick Tracy. On March 25, 2011, U.S. District Judge Dean Pregerson ruled in Beatty's favor.

2010–present

In 2010, Beatty directed and reprised his role as Dick Tracy in the 30-minute television special Dick Tracy Special, which premiered on TCM. The metafictional special features an interview with Tracy and film critic and historian Leonard Maltin, the latter of whom discusses the history and creation of Tracy. Tracy talks about how he admired Ralph Byrd and Morgan Conway who portrayed him in several films, but says he didn't care much for Beatty's portrayal of him or his film. The production of the special allowed Beatty to retain the rights to the character. At CinemaCon In April 2016, Beatty  reiterated that he intends to make a Dick Tracy sequel. In 2023, Beatty reprised the role of Tracy and played the character opposite himself in Dick Tracy Special: Tracy Zooms In, a follow up to the Dick Tracy Special that also aired on TCM. The 30-minute special, which mostly consists of a Zoom interview with Ben Mankiewicz and a returning Maltin in which Tracy criticizes aspects of the 1990 film adaptation to Beatty's face and suggests that a younger actor should take over the role of Tracy, concludes with Beatty and Tracy meeting in person and suggesting that Dick Tracy will return in future.

In 2016, Beatty released Rules Don't Apply, a fictionalized true-life romantic comedy about Howard Hughes, set in 1958 Hollywood and Las Vegas. It stars Beatty, who wrote, co-produced and directed the film. It co-stars Alden Ehrenreich and Lily Collins, with supporting actors including Annette Bening, Alec Baldwin, Matthew Broderick, Candice Bergen, Ed Harris and Martin Sheen. Some have said that Beatty's film was 40 years in the making.

In the mid-1970s, Beatty signed a contract with Warner Bros. to star in, produce, write, and possibly direct a film about Howard Hughes. The project was put on hold when Beatty began Heaven Can Wait. Initially, Beatty planned to film the life story of John Reed and Hughes back-to-back, but as he was getting deeper into the project, he eventually focused primarily on the Reed film Reds. In June 2011, it was reported that Beatty would produce, write, direct and star in a film about Hughes, focusing on an affair he had with a younger woman in the final years of his life.

During this period, Beatty interviewed actors to star in his ensemble cast. He met with Andrew Garfield, Alec Baldwin, Owen Wilson, Justin Timberlake, Shia LaBeouf, Jack Nicholson, Evan Rachel Wood, Rooney Mara, and Felicity Jones. It was released on November 23, 2016, and was Beatty's first film in 15 years. Rotten Tomatoes' "Top Critics" gave the film a 55% "Rotten" rating. The film was also a commercial disappointment.

In 2017, Beatty reunited with his Bonnie and Clyde co-star Faye Dunaway at the 89th Academy Awards, in celebration of the film's 50th anniversary. After being introduced by Jimmy Kimmel, they walked out onto the stage to present the Best Picture Award. They had been given the wrong envelope, leading Dunaway to incorrectly announce La La Land as Best Picture, instead of the actual winner, Moonlight. This became a social media sensation, trending all over the world. In 2018, Beatty and Dunaway returned to present Best Picture at the 90th Academy Awards, earning a standing ovation upon their entrance, making jokes about the previous year's flub. Without incident, Beatty announced The Shape of Water as the winner.

Personal life
Beatty has been married to actress Annette Bening since 1992. They have four children. Their eldest child came out as transgender (FTM) in 2012.

Before marriage
Prior to marrying Bening, Beatty was notorious for his large number of romantic relationships that received generous media coverage, having been linked to over 100 female celebrities. Leslie Caron said "Warren always had girlfriends who resembled his sister." Cher stated that "Warren has probably been with everybody I know." Beatty woke Caron up one night, telling her that he was worried that she was not thinking of him. Caron later realized that it was a sign of his narcissism and desire for control. She rejected his marriage proposals.

Politics

Beatty is a longtime supporter of the Democratic Party. In 1972, Beatty was part of the "inner circle" of Senator George McGovern's presidential campaign. He traveled extensively and was instrumental in organizing fundraising. Despite differences in politics, Beatty was also a friend of Republican Senator John McCain, with whom he agreed on the need for campaign finance reform. He was one of the pallbearers chosen by McCain himself at the senator's funeral in 2018.

Sexual misconduct allegation
On November 9, 2022, Kristina Charlotte Hirsch filed a lawsuit claiming that Beatty had groomed and manipulated her into having sex with him in 1973 when she was 14 and he was about 35. The lawsuit did not identify Beatty by name but described Hirsch's alleged abuser as having "acted in television and several Hollywood films, including portraying Clyde in Bonnie and Clyde, a major box-office success that earned DEFENDANT DOE an Academy Award for Best Actor"—all of which described Beatty. 

Hirsch's attorneys filed the motion in Los Angeles County Superior Court under a California law that allows people to temporarily override the statute of limitations and sue in cases involving underage sexual abuse, even if the abuse took place years or even decades earlier.

Filmography

Acting credits 
Film

Television

Theatre

Awards and honors 

Beatty has received the Eleanor Roosevelt Award from the Americans for Democratic Action, the Brennan Legacy Award from the Brennan Center for Justice at the New York University School of Law, the Phillip Burton Public Service Award from the Foundation for Taxpayer and Consumer Rights, and the Spirit of Hollywood Award from the Associates for Breast and Prostate Cancer Studies.

Beatty was a founding board member of the Center for National Policy, a founding member of the Progressive Majority, a member of the Council on Foreign Relations, has served as the Campaign Chair for the Permanent Charities Committee, and has participated in the World Economic Forum at Davos, Switzerland. He served on the Board of Trustees at the Scripps Research Institute, and the Board of Directors of the Motion Picture and Television Fund Foundation. He was named Honorary Chairman of the Stella Adler Studio of Acting in 2004.

The National Association of Theatre Owners awarded him with the Star of the Year Award in 1975, and in 1978 the Director of the Year Award and the Producer of the Year Award. He received the Alan J. Pakula Memorial Award from the National Board of Review in 1998. He received the Akira Kurosawa Lifetime Achievement Award in 2002 from the San Francisco International Film Festival. He has received the Board of Governors Award from the American Society of Cinematographers, the Distinguished Director Award from the Costume Designers Guild, the Life Achievement Award from the Publicists Guild, and the Outstanding Contribution to Cinematic Imagery Award from the Art Directors Guild.

In 2004, he received the Kennedy Center Honors in Washington, D.C., and the Milestone Award from the Producers Guild of America. He was honored with the American Film Institute's Life Achievement Award in 2008. In March 2013, he was inducted into the California Hall of Fame. In 2016, he was honored by the Museum of the Moving Image  and received the Kirk Douglas Award for Excellence in Film from the Santa Barbara International Film Festival.

Beatty has received a number of international awards: in 1992, he was made a Commander of the Order of Arts and Letters (France); in 1998, he was nominated for a Golden Lion for Best Film (Bulworth), and received a Career Golden Lion from the Venice Film Festival; in 2001, he received the Donostia Lifetime Achievement Award from the San Sebastián International Film Festival; in 2002, he received the British Academy Fellowship from BAFTA; and in 2011, he was awarded the Stanley Kubrick Britannia Award.

Unmade projects

 Untitled Dick Tracy sequel – Beatty was developing this project as of 2016; he reportedly had been talking about doing a sequel ever since the original was released in 1990.
 Ocean of Storms – Beatty was to produce and star in this aging astronaut love story. Annette Bening was set to co-star. The script was written by Tony Bill & Ben Young Mason with revisions by Wesley Strick, Robert Towne, Lawrence Wright, Stephen Harrigan and Aaron Sorkin. Martin Scorsese was at one point attached to direct. The project was in development from 1989 until around 2000.
 Bulworth 2000 – a sequel to his 1998 film that would have continued where the first film ended by satirizing the 2000 Presidential Election.
 The Mermaid – Warren Beatty was attached to star in this love story about a sailboat racer who falls in love with a mermaid. The script was in development as early as 1983, from screenwriter Robert Towne. Herbert Ross was attached to direct it. However, they were eclipsed by the Ron Howard/Tom Hanks movie "Splash" (1984) and the Beatty project was canceled. 
 The Duke of Deception – Warren Beatty was attached to star in this Steven Zaillian scripted and directed adaptation of the book by Geoffrey Wolff. He was attached to the project from 2000 till about 2005. Eventually, the project was shelved after Beatty continued to procrastinate on his decision to star in it.
 Liberace – Warren Beatty was interested in making a film based on the memoir Behind the Candelabra: My Life with Liberace by Scott Thorson. The film would have been about the love affair between Liberace and Thorson and the death of Liberace in 1987. The film was intended to be a black comedy, a melodrama and a satire on the illusions of how people perceive celebrities, excess, materialism and the loneliness of wealthy people. The film was to star Robin Williams as Liberace, Justin Timberlake as Scott Thorson, Oliver Platt as Liberace's manager, Seymour Heller, Michael C. Hall as Thorson's first lover, Shirley MacLaine as Liberace's mother (which would have been the first time siblings Beatty and MacLaine would have worked together on a project) and Johnny Depp as Liberace's drug addicted plastic surgeon, Dr. Startz. Aside from a few drafts of the script and casting decisions, the film was never made. Scott Thorson's memoirs were eventually made into an HBO TV movie in 2013.
 Megalopolis – Warren Beatty was attached to co-star in Francis Ford Coppola's epic during the late 1990s and early 2000s, but the project was eventually shelved. 
 Edie – Between Ishtar and Dick Tracy, Beatty considered directing and co-writing with James Toback a film about the life and death of Warhol superstar Edie Sedgwick, whom Beatty personally knew. The film was to star Jennifer Jason Leigh as Edie and Al Pacino as Andy Warhol but never materialized.
 The Killing of a Chinese Bookie – During the late 1990s, Brett Ratner tried unsuccessfully for several years to convince Beatty to star in a remake of the 1976 film by cult director John Cassavetes.
 Vicky – In the mid-1990s, Beatty was developing a biopic of Victoria Woodhull from screenwriter James Toback. Beatty was going to produce, possibly direct and co-star with wife Annette Bening. After the failure of Love Affair in 1994, the project struggled to get off the ground. Toback was also in talks as possibly directing it. 
 Shrink – In the mid-1990s, Beatty was considering a comedy from screenwriter James Toback, that detailed the hectic life of a psychiatrist, which Beatty was to star in. However, Beatty and Toback could never get the ending just right, so the project died.

Explanatory notes

References

Further reading
 Ellis Amburn, The Sexiest Man Alive: A Biography of Warren Beatty, HarperCollins Publishers, New York, 2002. .
 Peter Biskind, Easy Riders, Raging Bulls: How the Sex-drugs-and-rock-'n'-roll Generation Saved Hollywood, Simon & Schuster, New York, 1998. .
 Suzanne Finstad, Warren Beatty: A Private Man, Random House, New York, 2005. .
 Mark Harris, Pictures at a Revolution: Five Movies and the Birth of New Hollywood, Penguin Press, New York, 2008. .
 Suzanne Munshower, Warren Beatty: His Life, His Loves, His Work, St. Martin's Press, New York, 1990. .
 Lawrence Quirk, The Films of Warren Beatty, Citadel Press, New Jersey, 1979. .
 Stephen J. Ross, "Hollywood Left and Right: How Movie Stars Shaped American Politics", Oxford Press, New York, 2011. .
 Peter Swirski, "1990s That Dirty Word, Socialism: Warren Beatty's Bulworth. Ars Americana Ars Politica. Montreal, London: McGill-Queen's University Press, 2010. .
 David Thomson, Warren Beatty: A Life and Story, Secker and Warburg, London, 1987. .
 David Thomson, Warren Beatty and Desert Eyes, Doubleday and Co., Inc., New York, 1987. .

External links

 
 
 
 The Carolyn Jackson Collection, no. 13 – Interview with Warren Beatty, from the Texas Archive of the Moving Image
 , with Elaine May speaking
 

1937 births
20th-century American male actors
21st-century American male actors
AFI Life Achievement Award recipients
Akira Kurosawa Award winners
American film producers
American male film actors
American male screenwriters
American people of Canadian descent
BAFTA fellows
Best Directing Academy Award winners
Best Director Golden Globe winners
Best Musical or Comedy Actor Golden Globe (film) winners
Cecil B. DeMille Award Golden Globe winners
David di Donatello winners
Directors Guild of America Award winners
Film directors from Virginia
Golden Globe Award-winning producers
Kennedy Center honorees
Living people
Male actors from Richmond, Virginia
New Star of the Year (Actor) Golden Globe winners
Northwestern University School of Communication alumni
Recipients of the Irving G. Thalberg Memorial Award
Scripps Research
Stella Adler Studio of Acting alumni
United States Air Force airmen
Virginia Democrats
Writers Guild of America Award winners
Washington-Liberty High School alumni